Carsten Schatz (born 10 January 1970) is a historian and a member of the Left Party in Germany.

He lives in Berlin, and joined the dictatorial Socialist Unity Party in East-Germany in 1988. He has been the local manager of the Left Party in Berlin since 2001, and a member of the Abgeordnetenhaus of Berlin, the state parliament of Berlin, since 2013.

He is out as gay, and is the first openly HIV-positive person to hold political office in Germany.

References

External links
 Personal Web page 

1970 births
German humanists
Living people
The Left (Germany) politicians
21st-century German politicians
LGBT legislators in Germany
Members of the Abgeordnetenhaus of Berlin
People with HIV/AIDS
Gay politicians
21st-century German LGBT people